Jackson's widowbird (Euplectes jacksoni) is a species of bird in the family Ploceidae.
It is found in Kenya and Tanzania.
Its natural habitats are subtropical or tropical high-altitude grassland and arable land.
It is threatened by habitat loss.

References

Jackson's widowbird
Birds of East Africa
Jackson's widowbird
Taxonomy articles created by Polbot